Govinda puram is a village in Ganjam district in the south of Odisha, India, bordering Andhra Pradesh. It is located southeast of Berhampur and northeast of Ichchapuram.
Govinda puram is a business center catering to surrounding villages. The major occupations are agriculture and trading.

Villages in Ganjam district